Jérôme Sylvestre (born 11 July 1979) is a Canadian snowboarder. He competed in the men's parallel giant slalom event at the 2002 Winter Olympics.

References

1979 births
Living people
Canadian male snowboarders
Olympic snowboarders of Canada
Snowboarders at the 2002 Winter Olympics
Sportspeople from Quebec